Americana Master Series may refer to:

 Americana Master Series: Best of the Sugar Hill Years, an album by Guy Clark
 Americana Master Series (Doc Watson album)